Alchemist is a stainless steel sculpture by Jaume Plensa, installed on the Massachusetts Institute of Technology campus, in Cambridge, Massachusetts, United States. The work was installed in 2010.

References

External links
 Alchemist at cultureNOW

2010 establishments in Massachusetts
2010 sculptures
Massachusetts Institute of Technology campus
Outdoor sculptures in Cambridge, Massachusetts
Stainless steel sculptures in the United States
Steel sculptures in Massachusetts
Sculptures by Jaume Plensa